John Gray Banks (June 30, 1888 – 1961) was a lawyer and political figure in Saskatchewan. He represented Pelly from 1948 to 1952 in the Legislative Assembly of Saskatchewan as a Liberal.

He was born in Durham, Ontario, the son of Richard H. Banks and Emily Gray, and was educated in Durham and at the University of Saskatchewan. In 1918, Banks married Edith Verna Allen. He lived in Kamsack, Saskatchewan. Banks was defeated by Arnold Feusi when he ran for reelection to the provincial assembly in 1952.

References 

Saskatchewan Liberal Party MLAs
1888 births
1961 deaths
People from Kamsack, Saskatchewan
People from Grey County
University of Saskatchewan alumni